Heyran-e Olya (also Romanized as Ḩeyrān-e ‘Olyā; also known as Ḩeyrān ‘Alī Shāmlū) is a village in Astara, in the Gilan Province, Iran. At the 2006 census, its population was 85, in 14 families.

References 

Populated places in Astara County